Helle Busacca (San Piero Patti, 21 December 1915 – Florence, 15 January 1996) was an Italian poet, painter, and writer.

Life
Born in a well-to-do family in San Piero Patti, Province of Messina, Sicily, Helle Busacca lived for part of her youth in her birthplace. Then she moved to Bergamo and later to Milan together with her parents. She graduated with a degree in classical letters at the Royal University of Milan. In the following years, she taught letters in various high schools, moving from city to city: Varese, Pavia, Milan, Naples, Siena, and finally Florence, where she died on 15 January 1996.

Her papers, which include correspondence, sketches, and rough drafts of published works, as well as many unpublished manuscripts, are kept in a special collection at the State Archives of Florence.

In December 2015, at a conference on the centenary of her birth, the Municipal Library of San Piero Patti was named for her.

Poetry

Busacca's papers, which include correspondence, sketches, and rough drafts of published works, as well as many unpublished manuscripts, are kept in a special collection at the State Archives of Florence.

Her work, especially her poetry and story writing, shows a profound originality and incisiveness that often departs from the intense testimony of a personal drama and from the consciousness of a tragic destiny. The author Busacca, nourished by a deep knowledge of classicism, forms a relationship with and is influenced by modern poetry of the most diverse origins and cultures, but with particular predilection for that of American background. In her works appear hints of the Beat Generation, Eliot, and Pound. Next to such influences, her work is marked by fluid variations of register that move from crude verbal violence to pinnacles of abstract and serene lyricism. A personally sorrowful but poetically fruitful note is the tragic memory of her brother Aldo's suicide, from which Busacca takes off to reach the sublime heights of a "message to the stars" and, almost paradoxically, to the concrete contemporaneity of an "act of social faith."

In "I quanti suicidio" (1972), the poet invents a language of the spoken word that is simple and immediate, meant for everyone to understand, as an indictment of the Italian system, the cowardice in her country that permitted the suicide of her brother, an unemployed scientist. The language she used, in its fiery directness and immediacy, was completely alienated from the experimental, skeptical, or symbolic language used in the poetry of her contemporaries.

Giorgio Linguaglossa writes:

Criticism and reviews
Carlo Betocchi, Eugenio Montale, Raffaele Crovi, Giuseppe Zagarrio, Mario Grasso, Domenico Cara, Donato Valli, Gilda Musa, Bortolo Pento, Carlo Bo, Luciano Anceschi, Claudio Marabini, Oreste Macrì, Marco Marchi, Maurizio Cucchi, Gabriella Maleti, Mario Luzi, Alberico Sala, Sergio Solmi, Luigi Testaferrata, Vittorio Sereni, Marcello Venturi, Leonardo Sinisgalli, and Giorgio Linguaglossa, among others, have written about her.

Works

Books
Giuoco nella memoria (Modena: Guanda, 1949).
Ritmi (Varese: Magenta, 1965).
I quanti del suicidio (Rome: S.E.T.I., 1972; reprinted: Bologna, Seledizioni, 1973).
I quanti del karma (Bologna: Seledizioni, 1974).
Niente poesia da Babele (Bologna: Seledizioni, 1980).
Il libro del risucchio (Castelmaggiore: Book, 1990).
Il libro delle ombre cinesi (Fondi: Confrontographic, 1990).
Pene di amor perdute (Ragusa: Cultura Duemila, 1994).
Ottovolante, edited by Idolina Landolfi (Florence: Cesati, 1997).
Poesie scelte, edited by Daniela Monreale (Salerno: Ripostes, 2002).
Vento d'estate (Maser: Amadeus, 1987) (prose).
Racconti di un mondo perduto (Genoa: Silverpress, 1992) (prose).

In journals
"I bestioni e gli eroi" and "L'America scoperta e riscoperta", in: Civiltà delle macchine, 1956.
"Il mio strano amico Montale", in: L'Albero, 1986, vol. 39

Unpublished works
Contrappunto (autobiographical novel).
Controcorrente (autobiographical novel).
"Una storia senza storia" (short story)
De Rerum Natura (translation from Lucretius).

Personal archive
The Alessandra Contini Bonacossi Archive for Women's Memory and Writing has curated the collecting, organizing, and storing of her papers at the State Archives of Florence.

Notes

References

Bibliography
Scritture femminili in Toscana: Voci per un autodizionario, edited by Ernestina Pellegrini (Florence: Editrice le Lettere, 2006).
Mariella Bettarini, "Donne e poesia, prima parte (dal 1963 al 1979)" in: Poesia no. 119, July/August 1998.
Daniela Monreale, "Vita e scrittura in una parola ribelle: La poesia di Helle Busacca" in: Le voci della Luna no. 20, March 2002.
Ernestina Pellegrini, Introduction to Helle Busacca, Poesie scelte, edited by Daniela Monreale (Salerno: Edizioni Ripostes 2002).
Gabriella Musetti, review of Helle Busacca, Poesie scelte in: Leggere Donna no. 104, May–June 2003.
Alessandra Caon, "L'harakiri violento della parola-ferita" in: Le voci della Luna no. 28, March 2004.
Alessandra Caon, Rabbia e dissolvenze: la poesia di Helle Busacca (graduate thesis), Università degli Studi di Padova, 2004.
Alessandra Caon and Silvio Ramat, "Helle Busacca, Il pathos della parola" in: Poesia no. 180, February 2004.
Serena Mafrida, Helle Busacca: La scala ripida verso le stelle (Florence: Società Editrice Fiorentina, 2010).
Giorgio Linguaglossa, Dalla lirica al discorso poetico: Storia della poesia italiana 1945–2010 (Rome: EdiLet, 2011).

External links
Archivio di Stato di Firenze, Fondo Helle Busacca, archiviodistato.firenze.it.

1915 births
1996 deaths
People from San Piero Patti
Writers from Florence
20th-century Italian poets
Italian women poets
University of Milan alumni
20th-century Italian women writers
Politicians from the Province of Messina